Sinstauchira is a genus of grasshoppers in the subfamily Catantopinae, not assigned to any tribe.  Species can be found in southern China and Vietnam.

Species
The Orthoptera Species File. lists:
 Sinstauchira gressitti (Tinkham, 1940)
 Sinstauchira hui Li, Lu, Jiang & Meng, 1995
 Sinstauchira puerensis Li, Xu & Zheng, 2014
 Sinstauchira pui Liang & Zheng, 1986
 Sinstauchira ruficornis Huang, 1985
 Sinstauchira yaoshanensis Li, 1987
 Sinstauchira yunnana Zheng, 1981 - type species

References

External links 
 

Acrididae genera
Catantopinae
Orthoptera of Asia
Orthoptera of Indo-China